The Treaty of Lochaber was signed in South Carolina on 18 October 1770 by British representative John Stuart and the Cherokee people, fixing the boundary for the western limit of the colonial frontier settlements of Virginia and North Carolina.

Lord Shelburne in London was determined to settle disputes along the western frontier in order to avoid more conflict between colonists and various Native American nations. Although he lost his office as Southern Secretary in October 1768, negotiations progressed with tribal chiefs (usually representing towns in their decentralized society) regarding the North American colonial frontier. The Treaty of Fort Stanwix in November 1768 fixed the boundary lines between tribes and colonists to the north of Virginia. The border variances from the Treaty of Hard Labour led to negotiations where 1000 Cherokee leaders were hosted by Alexander Cameron (d. 1781) at Lochabar Plantation in Ninety-Six District, South Carolina.

Based on the terms of the accord, the Cherokee relinquished all claims to land from the previous North Carolina and Virginia border to a point six miles east of Long Island of the Holston River in present-day Kingsport, Tennessee, to the mouth of the Kanawha River at present-day Point Pleasant, West Virginia, in Mason County. The North Carolina-Virginia border at this time was along the 36° 30' parallel in present-day Tennessee, because both colonies believed their charters extended to the west.

The south fork of the Holston River was agreed to become the southern bounds because colonial settlers were confused as to where the parallel ran. Therefore, "North of the Holston" settlers were considered to be outside of the Cherokee lands. In this treaty, the Cherokee surrendered their rights to the remaining land in present-day southern West Virginia not included in the Treaty of Hard Labour in October 1768.

References

1770 in the Thirteen Colonies
British colonization of the Americas
Cherokee and United Kingdom treaties
History of the Thirteen Colonies
Lochaber
Lochaber
1770 treaties
Treaties involving territorial changes